The Quidora was one of four torpedo boats built in Spain for the Chilean Navy since 1962, based originally in the Jaguar-class fast attack craft FPB-36 design of the German Lürssen Werft. Her sister ship Fresia PTF-81 is now a museum ship in Punta Arenas.

Design
The original design of the Jaguar-class included 4 Mercedes-Benz MB 518 B diesel engines, speed of 42 kn and 700 smi range of operation. But in order to operate in the fjords and channels of Chile the boat needed a greater range and time of operation in sea, hence only two engines were installed and the speed was reduced to 28 kn. This class was later named "Barceló-class" in Spain.

Quidora incident
In November 1967, under the command of Lieutenant Leonardo Prieto Vial, the Quidora entered in the Argentine Bay of Ushuaia repelling Argentine warships that where occupying the disputed canals during the Beagle conflict. Lieutenant Prieto was retired from the navy after the incident by Chilean President Eduardo Frei.

ARA Gurruchaga incident
On February 19, 1982, six weeks before the beginning of the Falklands War, an incident occurred that could have sparked a full-fledged war between Chile and Argentina during the Papal mediation in the Beagle conflict. An Argentine patrol boat, the ARA Gurruchaga (Ex-USS Luiseno (ATF-156)) was anchored at Deceit Island inside the Beagle zone under mediation in Vatican, ostensibly providing support for sports boats participating in the Rio de Janeiro-Sydney boat race. The Quidora approached and ordered the Argentine ship to leave the area. She fired several warning shots when the Argentine craft refused to move, as other Chilean ships converged to the scene. Although originally ordered not to leave the area and to wait for Argentine warships to arrive, the Argentine patrol boat received new orders to proceed to port as it became obvious that the Chilean navy had no intentions of backing down.

Service boat
In 1997 the boat was refitted as general service boat (Lancha de Servicio General) and served in Valparaíso, Coquimbo, Iquique and Arica. Her hull classification symbol was changed to LSG-1605.

Museum

Of the four boats, the Fresia is now exhibited in Embarcadero Tres Puentes at the Punta Arenas Naval Base.

See also
 List of violent incidents at the Argentine border
 List of decommissioned ships of the Chilean Navy

References

External links
 Chilean Navy website, Quidora, retrieved on 4 April 2013
 Hugo Alsina Calderón, Torpederas en acción  en Revista de Marina,
 M. Agostini, las lanchas torpederas Clase “Barceló” de la Armada de Chile, retrieved on 4 April 2013

Torpedo boats of the Chilean Navy
1965 ships